The 2023 Women's Indoor Hockey World Cup was the sixth edition of this tournament and played from 5 to 11 February 2023 in Pretoria, South Africa.

The Netherlands defeated Austria in the final to win their third overall title, while the Czech Republic defeated host South Africa for the bronze medal.

Qualification
All the teams which qualified for the cancelled 2022 edition of the tournament were eligible to participate in the 2023 edition.

First round
The schedule was released on 17 October 2022.

All times are local (UTC+2).

Pool A

Pool B

Classification matches

Eleventh place game

Ninth place game

Second round

Bracket

Quarter-finals

Semi-finals

Third place game

Final

Final standings

Awards
The following awards were given at the conclusion of the tournament.

Goalscorers

See also
 2023 Men's FIH Indoor Hockey World Cup

Notes

References

2023
Indoor Hockey World Cup
Indoor Hockey world Cup Women
Indoor Hockey World Cup Women
International women's field hockey competitions hosted by South Africa
Sports competitions in Pretoria
FIH Indoor Hockey World Cup